Philip J. "Woodchuck" Welmas (February 26, 1891 - November 15, 1968) was a Native American professional football player in the early National Football League. He was a member of the Cupeño people. 

Welmas played in four games in the NFL with the Oorang Indians for the 1923 season. He ended his professional career after the Indians disbanded in 1923. 

Welmas attended college and played college football at the Carlisle Indian School in Carlisle, Pennsylvania.

Notes

References
 What's an Oorang? 
 The Oorang Indians 
 Ongoing Research Project Uniform Numbers of the NFL Pre-1933

1891 births
Native American sportspeople
Players of American football from California
Oorang Indians players
Carlisle Indians football players
Carlisle Indian Industrial School alumni
1968 deaths
Cupeno